Aninsk (Anaa) is a rural locality (an ulus) in Khorinsky District, Republic of Buryatia, Russia. The population was 270 as of 2010. There are 10 streets.

Geography 
Aninsk is located 6 km northeast of Khorinsk (the district's administrative centre) by road. Khorinsk is the nearest rural locality.

References 

Rural localities in Khorinsky District